Farmersville High School is a public high school located in Farmersville, Texas, United States. It is part of the Farmersville Independent School District located in eastern Collin County and, as of the 2018-2020 realignment, is classified as a 4A school by the UIL.  The school is located on the northwest side of the city of Farmersville. In 2015, the school was rated "Met Standard" by the Texas Education Agency.

Athletics
The Farmersville Farmers compete in the following sports:

 Baseball
 Basketball
 Cross Country
 Football
 Golf
 Powerlifting
 Softball
 Soccer
 Tennis
 Track and Field
 Volleyball

State Titles
Football 
2007(2A/D1)
One Act Play 
1975(1A)

Notable alumni
 Jim Hess, former college coach and NFL scout
 Tex Watson, murderer and member of the Manson Family; Watson was an honor student, captain of the football team, and set a state record for high hurdles

References

External links

High schools in Collin County, Texas
Public high schools in Texas